Audley Rural is a civil parish in the district of Newcastle-under-Lyme, Staffordshire, England.  It contains 14 buildings that are recorded in the National Heritage List for England.  Of these, one is listed at Grade II*, the middle of the three grades, and the others are at Grade II, the lowest grade.  The parish contains villages, including Audley and Bignall End, and is otherwise rural.  Most of the listed buildings are farmhouses, and the other listed buildings include a church, two watermills, a milepost, a memorial on a hill, a row of houses and shops, a church hall, and two war memorials.


Key

Buildings

References

Citations

Sources

Lists of listed buildings in Staffordshire
Borough of Newcastle-under-Lyme